"Ain't Love Grand" is the first single from American metalcore band Atreyu's debut album, Suicide Notes and Butterfly Kisses, released in 2002.

Concept

- Alex Varkatzas

Music video

The music video features the band performing in red room, with footage of party intercut. At the party, a man becomes intoxicated and eventually blacks out. He later comes to watch medics inspect his unconscious body, while screaming at his body to get up. Members of the band also are seen as background characters at the party.

Notes

2002 debut singles
Atreyu (band) songs
2002 songs
Victory Records singles